In the Eurovision Song Contest 1963, Sweden was represented by Monica Zetterlund, a popular jazz singer. Her song, written by Bobbie Ericsson and Beppe Wolgers, was called "En gång i Stockholm". Carli Thornehave also sung the winning song at the national final.

The contest, which was held in London, did not go very well for Sweden. They scored for the first (and by so far only) time the infamous nul points, among with their neighbours Finland and Norway, and also Netherlands.

Before Eurovision

Melodifestivalen 1963 
Melodifestivalen 1963 (known as Eurovisionsschlagern, svensk final) was the selection for the sixth song to represent Sweden at the Eurovision Song Contest. It was the fifth time that this system of picking a song had been used. One singer performed the song with a large orchestra and one with a smaller orchestra. 816 songs were submitted to SVT for the competition. The final was held in the Cirkus in Stockholm on 16 February 1963, broadcast on Sveriges Radio TV but was not broadcast on radio.

1: Performer with large orchestra
2: Performer with smaller orchestra

At Eurovision 
Monica Zetterlund performed "En gång i Stockholm" at Eurovision, and became the first and only artist to score "nul points" for Sweden.

Voting 
Sweden did not receive any points at the 1963 Eurovision Song Contest.

References

External links
ESCSweden.com (in Swedish)
Information site about Melodifestivalen
Eurovision Song Contest National Finals

1963
Countries in the Eurovision Song Contest 1963
1963
Eurovision
Eurovision

es:Melodifestivalen 1963
sv:Melodifestivalen 1963